Cold Dark Matter is the fifth album by industrial metal band Red Harvest. It was released in 2000. It was later re-released in 2001 in the US, with extra tracks.

Track listing

References

External links
 Red Harvest's official website

2000 albums
Red Harvest (band) albums